HMS Ardrossan was a s built for the Royal Navy during the Second World War.

Design and description
The Bangor class was designed as a small minesweeper that could be easily built in large numbers by civilian shipyards; as steam turbines were difficult to manufacture, the ships were designed to accept a wide variety of engines. The ship's complement consisted of 60 officers and ratings.

She was powered by two Metrovick-Curtis geared steam turbines, each driving one shaft, using steam provided by two Admiralty three-drum boilers.

The turbine-powered Bangors were armed with a  anti-aircraft gun and a single QF 2-pounder (4 cm) AA gun. In some ships the 2-pounder was replaced a single or twin  20 mm Oerlikon AA gun, while most ships were fitted with four additional single Oerlikon mounts over the course of the war. For escort work, her minesweeping gear could be exchanged for around 40 depth charges.

Construction and career
Ardrossan was built by Blyth Shipbuilding Company, at Blyth, Northumberland and launched on 22 July 1941. Thus far she has been the only ship of the Royal Navy named after the Scottish town of Ardrossan. She had a relatively quiet wartime career and was sold on 1 January 1948 for breaking up. She arrived at the breaker's yard at Thornaby-on-Tees on 19 August 1948.

References

Bibliography
 
 
 
 Warlow, Ben, Lt. Cdr., Royal Navy (2004) Battle Honours of the Royal Navy, Maritime Books: Liskeard, UK

External links
 HMS Ardrossan at Uboat.net

 

Bangor-class minesweepers of the Royal Navy
Ships built on the River Blyth
1941 ships
World War II minesweepers of the United Kingdom